is a Soto Zen temple in Obama, Fukui Prefecture, Japan.

Buddhist temples in Fukui Prefecture